Jackeline Arroyo or  Jacqueline Arroyo is a Mexican television actress, presenter and glamour model. As an actress she is perhaps best known for her appearances in Mujer, casos de la vida real  (2002-3) and as Tomasa in the telenovela Mañana es para siempre (2008-9). She appeared in the March 2012 issue of Mexican Playboy magazine.

Filmography

Television
1996 Banda Max  -Hostess
1997 Salud, dinero y amor
1999 Todo se vale - Host
2000 Hasta en las mejores familias  -Host
2001 Sin pecado concebido2001-2002 Salomé  -  Irma
2002  Vivan los niños -Thelma
2002-2003 Mujer, casos de la vida real2004 La Jaula - Dominga
2005 Contra viento y marea - Odalis II / Odalys
2008-2009 Mañana es para siempre -Tomasa
2010 La cantina del Tunco Maclovich2011-2014 Como dice el dicho'' - Rebeca / Celia Martell / Rebeca

References

External links
Official site

Mexican television actresses
Living people
Mexican female models
Mexican television presenters
Year of birth missing (living people)
Mexican women television presenters
21st-century Mexican women